Dubai Airport Free Zone (commonly known as DAFZA) is an elevated rapid-transit metro station on the Green Line of the Dubai Metro in Dubai, UAE.

The station opened as part of the Green Line on 9 September 2011. Like most Dubai Metro stations, DAFZA lies above ground level. It is located on Al Nahda Street between Al Qusais and Al Twar. It is approximately 1/2 mile from the entrance of the eponymous Dubai Airport Free Zone (DAFZA). The station is also close to a number of bus routes. The station is close to Terminal 2 of Dubai International Airport.

References

Railway stations in the United Arab Emirates opened in 2011
Dubai Metro stations